Bethlehem is an unincorporated community in Richland County, in the U.S. state of Ohio.

History
Bethlehem had its start in the 1830s as a small colony centered around a Catholic church. A post office called Bethlehem was established in 1887, and remained in operation until 1895.

References

Unincorporated communities in Richland County, Ohio
Unincorporated communities in Ohio